Intiki Deepam Illale is a 1961 Indian Telugu-language romance film, produced by T. R. Ramanna and directed by V. N. Reddy. It stars N. T. Rama Rao, B. Saroja Devi and Jaggayya, with music composed by Viswanathan–Ramamoorthy. The film was simultaneously made in Tamil as Manapanthal (1961); both versions were based on the American film  Sabrina (1954).

Plot 
Raja Shekar and Chandra Shekar are siblings hailing from a Zamindar family. The elder one, Raja Shekar is good, but an alcoholic, while the younger one Chandra Shekar is a successful medical practitioner at Madras. Chandra Shekar stays as a tenant in the house of widowed Devamma and her daughter Malathi, who loves him. However, on a rail journey to his hometown, he meets an elderly man, Dharmalingam with his daughter Suguna and both fall in love, hoping to marry soon. Meanwhile, Seetamma mother of Raja Shekar and Chandra Shekar is worried about his drunkard son, hopes the marriage will reform him, and fixed his marriage with a girl, none other than Suguna, without realising that her younger son is in love with her. Suguna also realises that the bridegroom is different at the last minute of marriage. To keep up her father's prestige she performs the marriage. The wedding happens, and Chandra Shekar, due to an accident, is unable to attend it and has no knowledge that the bride is his sweetheart Suguna. Later, when he meets her, he is shocked. The husband suspects his wife and brother when he learns she was her sweetheart earlier. He decides to kill them. Meanwhile, Seetamma dies, leaving behind all the property to her daughter-in-law. Now, Chandra Shekar puts on an act of having become an alcoholic and makes overtures to his sister-in-law Suguna, who slaps him. Watching this, Raja Shekar realises the truth and apologises to her. The family is reunited. While on a train journey, Chandra Shekar notices a young woman lying on the railway track to commit suicide, who is Malathi and still in love with him. The two marry and live happily.

Cast 
 N. T. Rama Rao as Raja Shekar
 B. Saroja Devi as Suguna
 Jaggayya as Chandra Shekar
 Relangi as Dr. Avataram
 Ramana Reddy as Astama Jyothishkudu
 V. Nagayya as Dharmalingam
 Vangara as Sidhanthi
 Kannamba as Seetamma
 Girija as Navami
 E. V. Saroja as Malathi
 Malathi as Devamma

Soundtrack 
Music composed by Viswanathan–Ramamoorthy.

References

External links 
 

1961 films
1961 romance films
Films scored by Viswanathan–Ramamoorthy
Indian black-and-white films
Indian remakes of American films
Indian romance films